Sky Box Office is Sky's pay-per-view (PPV) system operated in the United Kingdom and Ireland. There were three branded divisions of Sky Box Office – Sky Cinema Box Office, Sky Sports Box Office and Sky 3D Box Office. Until 1 February 2011, the system ran under unified Sky Box Office branding. On 4 January 2017, all Sky Cinema Box Office channels ceased broadcasting, with only Sky Sports Box Office remaining available.

History
Sky Box Office launched on 16 March 1996 on Sky Analogue. At the time it carried mainly sporting events, such as major boxing fights. The first of these was Frank Bruno's WBC World Heavyweight Championship defence against Mike Tyson. Initially events were ordered by telephone, either on the day of broadcast for £14.95 or in advance at a reduced price of £9.99. Ordering an event charged the viewer and then the subscriber's VideoCrypt viewing card would be activated over the air, enabling the viewing of the broadcast. The charge would be levied unless the viewer cancelled prior to broadcast, or returned the viewing card as proof that the event hadn't been watched. On some occasions, Box Office events would be broadcast on other Sky channels, such as Sky Sports 3.

Four dedicated Sky Box Office channels were launched on 1 December 1997 on Sky Analogue. At this time multiple showings of selected movies, shown in advance of their broadcast on Sky's existing subscription movie channels, were added. Initial movies included The Long Kiss Goodnight and Courage Under Fire. However, at least one hour pre-ordering was required, and for most movies one purchase at £2.99 only bought one viewing.

With the move to Sky Digital in 1998, where the Sky Digibox provided a data return path, events and movies – the latter now copy protected – could be bought minutes before or even during the event either by telephone or through an on-screen menu and PIN system.

Sky launched a sister pay-per-view channel in August 2001, Premiership Plus, which shown select football matches from the Premier League live. The service closed in 2007 as Sky were forced by the European Union to break their broadcasting monopoly on the competition.

A range of pay-per-view 3-D films were also screened on Sky 3D.

On 1 February 2011, Sky Box Office was rebranded as Sky Movies Box Office for movies. Later in the year, Sky Sports Box Office branding was added for sports and Sky 3D Box Office for 3D.

On 4 January 2017, all Sky Cinema Box Office channels ceased broadcasting, with only Sky Sports Box Office remaining available.

Content
Although at launch it showed mainly sporting events, since the launch of Sky Digital, movies along with concerts became the predominant content. However, Sky Cinema Box Office's limited movie choices and relatively high prices increasingly left it suffering in comparison to online DVD rental systems. As of 2011, films were first shown on Sky Box Office on the same day as DVD release, prior to that there was a 2 to 3-month window between DVD release and Sky Box Office release. Some films still retained the 2 to 3-month window between DVD and Sky Box Office releases. Since 2017 only sports content is available for purchase.

Content can be purchased directly through a Sky remote control. This can be accomplished by pressing "Box Office", purchase an event, confirm the order and enter the PIN if prompted. They can also be ordered online via Sky Box Office.

Boxing pay-per-view fights

See also
BT Sport Box Office
ITV Box Office
Primetime (TV channel)
The Big Fight Live
BoxNation

References

External links

Sky Sports Box Office
Sky Movies Box Office at sky.com 

Sky television channels
Pay-per-view television channels in the United Kingdom
Movie channels in the United Kingdom
Television channels and stations established in 1996
1996 establishments in the United Kingdom